The Periya Tirumoli is a Tamil work of Vaishnava literature, consisting of 1,084 hymns. It was written by one of the poet-saints offered the designation of Alvar, Tirumangai. It is a piece of literature that is a part of the compilation of the Alvars' hymns, the Naalayira Divya Prabandham.

Description 
According to Sri Vaishnava tradition, Tirumangai Alvar converted to Vaishnavism due to the influence of his wife, Kumudavalli. He resorted to robbing the rich in order to feed and assist all those who shared his faith. Once, he attempted to rob a wedding party, not knowing that the bride and groom were Andal and Ranganatha. Unable to remove the beautiful toe-ring from the feet of the groom, he placed his head down, intending to bite it off the feet. He immediately realised that the feet were divine, and belonged to Vishnu himself. He gave up robbery, and composed the Periya Tirumoli to extol the deity after the latter taught him the Narayana mantra.
The opening ten verses of the Periya Tirumoli describe how Tirumangai was transformed after the meaning of the Narayana mantra dawned on him, which Sri Vaishnavism tradition acknowledges as the quintessential nature of the Vedas. Periya Tirumoli is the magnum opus of Tirumangai Alvar, a composition of devotional verses dwelling on the greatness of several Vaishnava shrines, and the auspicious attributes of God as experienced by a bhakti saint. There are also hymns that explore human suffering caused by bondage, and the ways of overcoming this concept, ultimately leading to the attainment of the Ultimate Reality. As Vedanta Desikan puts it, "the Periya Tirumoli provides a deep insight into the spiritual knowledge (arivu taruṁ periya Tirumoli)."

Hymns 
Tirumangai describes Vishnu's Matsya avatara with these verses:

The saint also wrote taniyans (stray verses) in this text: A torch that drives off the darkness/ignorance from the heart, good ambrosia against the poison (nañcukku) that is unending rebirth (ațankā nețum pirati, lit. non-shortening long birth), literature/exemplification of the five [that are] the topics (turaikal) of the good treatise about Tamil, the essence of the Āraṇam [i.e. the Veda), a spark of fire (analin pori) that burns (lit. for) the cotton (thread] of other schools of thought (paracamaya-p-pañcukku): [these are] the treatises of Parakālan [i.e. Tirumankai Ālvār).

See also 
 Tirunetuntantakam
 Tirukkuruntantakam
 Perumal Tirumoli

References 

Naalayira Divya Prabandham
Sri Vaishnavism
Alvars
Vaishnava texts